Scranton Armory is a historic National Guard armory located at Scranton, Lackawanna County, Pennsylvania.  It was built in 1900, and is a four-story, 20 bays by 26 bays, brick and stone building executed in the Romanesque Revival style. The front facade features a central stone arch entrance flanked by crenellated towers.

It was added to the National Register of Historic Places in 1989.

References

Armories on the National Register of Historic Places in Pennsylvania
Romanesque Revival architecture in Pennsylvania
Infrastructure completed in 1900
Buildings and structures in Scranton, Pennsylvania
National Register of Historic Places in Lackawanna County, Pennsylvania